Lukasz Kieloch (born 15 March 1976) is a Poland born German male. He was a member of the Germany men's national water polo team, playing as a driver. He was a part of the team at the 2004 Summer Olympics. On club level he played for SV Cannstatt in Germany.

References

1976 births
Living people
German male water polo players
Water polo players at the 2004 Summer Olympics
Olympic water polo players of Germany
People from Ostrowiec Świętokrzyski
Polish emigrants to Germany